Cynthia Barbara Meyer (born October 6, 1965, in New York City, United States) is a Canadian trap shooter who won a gold medal for Canada at the 2002 Commonwealth Games in Manchester, England. Meyer is also a former world championship medalist in the double trap. Meyer was on Canada's Olympic teams in 1996, 2000 and 2004. After missing out on selection for the 2008 and 2012 Olympics, Meyer was named to Canada's team for the 2016 Olympics.

References

External links
 
 
 
 
 

1965 births
Living people
Canadian female sport shooters
Olympic shooters of Canada
Shooters at the 1996 Summer Olympics
Shooters at the 2000 Summer Olympics
Shooters at the 2004 Summer Olympics
Shooters at the 2016 Summer Olympics
Commonwealth Games medallists in shooting
Commonwealth Games gold medallists for Canada
Shooters at the 2002 Commonwealth Games
Shooters at the 2014 Commonwealth Games
Pan American Games medalists in shooting
Pan American Games silver medalists for Canada
Shooters at the 2003 Pan American Games
Sportspeople from New York City
Medalists at the 2003 Pan American Games
21st-century Canadian women
Medallists at the 2002 Commonwealth Games